Joseph Schaack (born March 26, 1945 in Luxembourg City) is a politician from Luxembourg. He is a leading member of the General Confederation of Civil Servants. In 1999 he ran for election for the Democratic Party. From 1 November 2004 to 4 February 2008, he was the director of the customs administration.

References

External links 
Details on Government Positions Held
Details on Government Positions Held 

Members of the Chamber of Deputies (Luxembourg)
Democratic Party (Luxembourg) politicians
1945 births
Living people
People from Luxembourg City